Trouble in Paradise is an idiom used to describe problems in supposedly positive situations.

Trouble in Paradise may also refer to:

Books
 Trouble in Paradise (Parker novel), a 1998 crime novel by Robert B. Parker
 Trouble in Paradise, a 1985 translation of the 1979 novel Les Coulisses du ciel by Pierre Boulle
 Trouble in Paradise, a 2006 book in the Undercover Brothers series by Franklin W. Dixon
 Trouble in Paradise, a 2014 book by Slavoj Žižek

Film and television
 Trouble in Paradise (1932 film), a 1932 film by Ernst Lubitsch
 Trouble in Paradise (1950 film), a West German comedy film
 Trouble in Paradise (1989 film), a 1989 television film by Di Drew
 Trouble in Paradise (1989 Dutch film), a 1989 Dutch film by Robbe De Hert
 Trouble in Paradise (Irish TV series), a 2007 drama television series featuring Angeline Ball
 Trouble in Paradise (TV series), a 2009 Australian documentary television series

Music

Albums
 Trouble in Paradise (Deborah Allen album), 1980, or its title track
 Trouble in Paradise (Anri album), 1986
 Trouble in Paradise, a 2004 album by B. J. Cole
 Trouble in Paradise, a 2011 album by Andru Donalds
 Trouble in Paradise (Elemeno P album), 2005, or its title track
 Trouble in Paradise (Elhae album), 2019
 Trouble in Paradise (La Roux album), 2014
 Trouble in Paradise (Randy Newman album), 1983
 Trouble in Paradise, a 1986 album by Romanovsky and Phillips, or its title track
 Trouble in Paradise (Souther-Hillman-Furay Band album), 1975, or its title track

Songs
 "Trouble in Paradise", a 1960 song by The Crests
 "Trouble in Paradise" (Loretta Lynn song), 1974
 "Trouble in Paradise", a 1981 song by The Greg Kihn Band
 "Trouble in Paradise", a 1983 song by Al Jarreau from his album Jarreau
 "Trouble in Paradise", a 1980 song by Huey Lewis and the News from their album Huey Lewis and the News
 "Trouble in Paradise", a 1988 song by Bruce Springsteen from his album Tracks
 "Trouble in Paradise", a 2019 song by Alice Merton from her album Mint

Video games
 Dig Dug II: Trouble in Paradise, a 1985 arcade game sequel
 Lilo & Stitch: Trouble in Paradise, a 2002 video game tie-in to the Disney animated film Lilo & Stitch
 Viva Piñata: Trouble in Paradise, a 2008 video game sequel

Other uses
 Trouble in Paradise, wrestler Kofi Kingston's finishing move
 "Trouble in Paradise", from the series of audiobooks Doctor Who: Destiny of the Doctor